The Whitehouse–Mechanicsville Historic District is a historic district located along old New Jersey Route 28, Mill, Lamington and School Roads in Whitehouse and Mechanicsville, unincorporated communities in Readington Township, Hunterdon County, New Jersey. It was added to the National Register of Historic Places on March 17, 2015 for its significance in architecture and community development. The district includes 140 contributing buildings.

History
The villages of Whitehouse and Mechanicsville developed along the 1806 stage coach route, then known as the New Jersey Turnpike, that went between Easton, Pennsylvania and New Brunswick, New Jersey.

Description
The Whitehouse United Methodist Church, originally known as the Mechanicsville Methodist Episcopal Church, was built  with Italianate style. The house at 20 Old Highway 28 was built  with Italianate and Greek Revival styles. The Ryland Inn was built with Gothic Revival style with Italianate influences.

Gallery of contributing properties

See also
 Taylor's Mill Historic District

References

External links
 
 

Readington Township, New Jersey
National Register of Historic Places in Hunterdon County, New Jersey
Historic districts on the National Register of Historic Places in New Jersey
New Jersey Register of Historic Places
Gothic Revival architecture in New Jersey
Greek Revival architecture in New Jersey
Italianate architecture in New Jersey